The Provisional government of Catalonia was the regional government of Catalonia led by President Josep Tarradellas between 1977 and 1980. It was formed in December 1977 following the restoration of the Generalitat de Catalunya. It ended in April 1980 following the regional election.

Members

References

1977 establishments in Catalonia
1980 disestablishments in Catalonia
Cabinets established in 1977
Cabinets disestablished in 1980
Cabinets of Catalonia